Addameer (meaning "Conscience"), or Addameer Prisoner Support and Human Rights Association, is a Palestinian Non-Government Organization (NGO), based in Ramallah.

It monitors the treatment of Palestinian prisoners arrested in the West Bank by Israel and the Palestinian Authority and provides legal assistance.

History
Addameer was established in 1992. It defines its aims as twofold: support for Palestinian prisoners held in Israeli and Palestinian prisons and the provision of "free legal aid to political prisoners, advocates their rights at the national and international level, and works to end torture and other violations of prisoners' rights through monitoring, legal procedures and solidarity campaigns".

Khalida Jarrar, its former director, has been held repeatedly under administrative detention without trial.

The director of Addameer since 2006 has been Sahar Francis.

IDF raids on Addameer offices
The offices of Addameer have been raided, and documentation in their care seized, on four occasions.

2002
The first Israeli raid on Addameer offices was conducted in 2002, during the Israeli invasion of Ramallah in that year.

2012
The second incident took place in 2012. The timing coincided with the expiry of the annual International Human Rights Day. On 11 December, at approximately 3 am, the IDF conducted raids on the offices of Addameer and two other Palestinian NGOs, and from Addameer's offices 4 computers from the legal and documentation units containing information on prisoners and their cases, a hard drive, a video camera and employees' business cards were confiscated. The soldiers also ripped off and tore up posters of prisoners and hunger strikers pinned on the office walls. In the view of Allam Jarrar of the Palestinian NGO Network, the raid's timing was to be seen in the context of the United Nations General Assembly's recognition of Palestine as a de facto state two weeks earlier, on 29 November.

Executive Director Sahar Francis told Human Rights Watch that video equipment and paper files of prisoner's cases were also missing after the raid
According to a military spokesperson, the raids were based on a suspicion that the three NGOs were affiliated with the Popular Front for the Liberation of Palestine (PFLP), though no evidence has been produced to substantiate the claim, and the NGOs themselves deny the assertion.

The Israeli Human Rights NGO B'Tselem, also in the name of several other human rights organisations such as Gisha and Yesh Din, issued a strong protest, demanding not only the restitution of the confiscated property but that protection be given to civil society organizations, in particular those engaged in upholding the cause of human rights. Human Rights Watch also demanded that compensation be made for the damage caused. Joe Stork deputy Middle East director at Human Rights Watch stated:
'In the absence of warrants or demonstrated military necessity, these raids are nothing but an unlawful attempt to seriously harm the work of groups supporting the local population.. The Israeli military needs to justify why it was absolutely necessary to ransack the offices of Palestinian rights groups and seize their property.'

2019
At 2 o'clock in the morning of 19 September 2019, an IDF unit broke into the offices of Addameer and after ransacking it, took away, according to the inventory left, 'five laptops, memory cards, three laptop memories, one laptop card and several books'. According to the Al-Haq NGO, the raid and expropriation was in contravention of several principles of international law: private property in such circumstances is protected; and the pillaged items bore no relation to military needs. The loss of the material caused difficulties for the group at a time when 5,150 Palestinian prisoners, many assisted by Addameer, were incarcerated by Israel, and often in Israel, in contravention again of international law.

2022
On 18 August 2022, Israeli forces raided the headquarters of Addameer and six other organisations in Ramallah and al-Bireh, removed computers and equipment and ordered their closure.

Designation as a terrorist organization
In October 2021, Addameer was designated a terrorist organization by Israel, together with five other Palestinian non-profit, non-governmental organizations (Al-Haq, Bisan Center for Research and Development, Defence for Children International, Union of Palestinian Women's Committees and Union of Agricultural Work Committees). The designation was condemned by Amnesty International, Human Rights Watch, and the UN Office of the High Commissioner of Human Rights who called it a “frontal attack on the Palestinian human rights movement and on human rights everywhere.”

Reviewing secret Israel intelligence shared with the C.I.A., the latter could find no evidence to verify the Israeli accusations. 

In July 2022, nine EU countries (Belgium, Denmark, France, Germany, Ireland, Italy, the Netherlands, Spain and Sweden) issued a joint statement saying they will continue working with the six Palestinian organizations that Israel had banned because Israel had failed to prove that they should be considered terrorist organisations.

Notes

Citations

Sources

External links 
 Addameer Prisoner Support and Human Rights Association

Human rights organizations based in the State of Palestine
Non-governmental organizations involved in the Israeli–Palestinian conflict
Organizations established in 1992
Prisoner support